Marcela Restrepo Valencia (born 10 November 1995) is a Colombian footballer who plays as a midfielder for Spanish Primera Federación club DUX Logroño and the Colombia women's national team.

International career
Restrepo represented Colombia at the 2012 FIFA U-17 Women's World Cup. She made her senior debut on 19 July 2019 in a 0–1 friendly loss to Costa Rica.

International goals
Scores and results list Colombia's goal tally first

References

External links
Marcela Restrepo at BDFútbol

1995 births
Living people
People from Risaralda Department
Colombian women's footballers
Women's association football midfielders
UD Collerense (women) players
Sporting de Gijón (women) players
EdF Logroño players
Segunda Federación (women) players
Colombia women's international footballers
Footballers at the 2019 Pan American Games
Medalists at the 2019 Pan American Games
Pan American Games medalists in football
Pan American Games gold medalists for Colombia
Colombian expatriate women's footballers
Colombian expatriate sportspeople in Spain
Expatriate women's footballers in Spain
21st-century Colombian women